Kenneth H. Johnson (born November 7, 1962) is an American former basketball player.  He played for the Portland Trail Blazers of the National Basketball Association (NBA).

Johnson played college basketball for the University of Southern California and Michigan State University.  After the close of his college career, Johnson was drafted by the Chicago Bulls of the NBA in the second round of the 1985 NBA draft (28th pick overall).  He was subsequently traded to the Portland Trail Blazers and appeared in 64 games in the 1985–86 season, averaging 4.1 points and 3.8 rebounds per game.

References

1962 births
Living people
American men's basketball players
Basketball players from Alabama
Chicago Bulls draft picks
Forwards (basketball)
Michigan State Spartans men's basketball players
Portland Trail Blazers players
Sportspeople from Tuskegee, Alabama
Tri-City Chinook players
USC Trojans men's basketball players